The Rubeho forest partridge (Xenoperdix obscuratus) is a small, approximately  long, boldly barred, brownish partridge with rufous face, grey underparts, and olive-brown crown and upperparts. It has a red bill, brown iris, and yellow legs. Both sexes are similar.

It inhabits and is endemic to forests of the Rubeho Mountains in Tanzania. It was formerly considered to be a well-marked subspecies of the Udzungwa forest partridge, Xenoperdix udzungwensis of the Udzungwa Mountains, but is now recognized to be specifically distinct. Its diet consists mainly of beetles, ants, and seeds.

Due to ongoing habitat loss, small population size, limited range, and overhunting, Xenoperdix obscuratus is considered endangered, although it has not been evaluated by the IUCN separately from X. udzungwensis.

Notes

References

External links
 BirdLife Species Factsheet

Rubeho forest partridge
Endemic birds of Tanzania
Rubeho forest partridge
Taxobox binomials not recognized by IUCN